Fynbo is a semi-hard Danish cheese named after the island of Fyn.

Fynbo cheese has a flavor of buckwheat and is processed with a combination of mesophilic and thermophilic bacterial cultures. Experiments with secondary proteolysis of Fynbo have helped to identify an important peptide produced during cheese ripening, αs1-casein (f1-23).

In popular culture
Fynbo cheese was mentioned in Monty Python's Cheese Shop sketch.

See also
 List of cheeses

References

External links

Danish cheeses
Cow's-milk cheeses